Czajków may refer to the following places:
Czajków, Kalisz County in Greater Poland Voivodeship (west-central Poland)
Czajków, Lesser Poland Voivodeship (south Poland)
Czajków, Masovian Voivodeship (east-central Poland)
Czajków, Ostrzeszów County in Greater Poland Voivodeship (west-central Poland)
Czajków, Turek County in Greater Poland Voivodeship (west-central Poland)